is the Spanish kennel club.

It has been a full member of the Federation Cynologique Internationale since 30 May 1912.

It has responsibility for the registration of all dogs in Spain.

References

1911 establishments in Spain
Fédération Cynologique Internationale
Organisations based in Spain with royal patronage
Organisations based in Madrid 
Organizations established in 1911
Kennel clubs